Igor Kanygin (born 6 June 1956, in Vitebsk) is a Belarusian former wrestler who competed in the 1980 Summer Olympics.

References

1956 births
Living people
Sportspeople from Vitebsk
Belarusian male sport wrestlers
Olympic wrestlers of the Soviet Union
Wrestlers at the 1980 Summer Olympics
Soviet male sport wrestlers
Olympic silver medalists for the Soviet Union
Olympic medalists in wrestling
Medalists at the 1980 Summer Olympics
20th-century Belarusian people
21st-century Belarusian people